Cathy McClure (born 1965) is an American visual artist recognized for her kinetic sculptures and zoetropic installations which often incorporate reengineered mechanical toys, video, sound, strobes and other lighting effects. McClure's artworks have been exhibited worldwide in museums, galleries, and in the public realm.

Early life, education, influences, and artistic practice 
McClure was born in Abilene, Texas and raised in Jonesboro, Arkansas. McClure returned to Texas after high school, settling first in Dallas. McClure attended Texas Tech University where she studied painting, sculpture and metal design. She was particularly inspired by her jewelry design and metalsmithing professor Robly Glover, and her glassblowing professor Bill Bagley. While attending Texas Tech, McClure co-founded Spiral Glass. McClure received her BFA in 1995.

Following her undergraduate studies, McClure relocated to Seattle to attend the University of Washington where she received an MFA in 1997. McClure has acknowledged influential teachers during her studies at UW – Doug Jeck, Akio Takimori, Shawn Brixey, Mary Lee Hu, and Roger Horner - who all reaffirmed McClure's belief that "there are no boundaries to art-making.”

While McClure's interest and background in metalsmithing has been a consistent feature of her work, her artistic practice spans many genres of art-making and is not limited to one artistic discipline. McClure has been described as an ‘anti-disciplinary artist' as her art resists easy categorization.

Awards 
The same year she graduated from University of Washington, McClure was awarded the 19th annual Betty Bowen Award Grand Prize from the Seattle Art Museum which honors a Northwest artist for their original, exceptional, and compelling work. McClure has received multiple residencies, grants, and awards including Le Quai Fete, Paris and Washington's Artist Trust Fellowship. McClure was a 2018 Artist In Residence at Pilchuck Glass School, and was awarded an AIR at the Vashon Residency in 2021.

Exhibitions

Early zoetropic installations 
In 1999, for her first museum solo exhibition, McClure produced a three-part zoetropic installation for the exhibition ‘Team Works' at San Francisco's Yerba Buena Center for the Arts. In one part of the installation, McClure arranged her silver, copper, brass, and steel abstracted human figures on spinning metal disks which were lit by strobe lights. These figures were described by art critic David Bonetti as "miniature grandchildren of Bauhaus master Oskar Schlemmer's mechano-morphic sculptures.” McClure's theatrical scene was enhanced by raucous carnival music, creating a "visual and aural three-ring circus that scares and delights equally.”

Another of McClure's zoetropic installations, ‘People Doing Things, Shiny Objects, Great Color, Occasional Music', was included in the Bellevue Arts Museum's Pacific Northwest Annual in 2000 where McClure won Best in Show. The installation's ambiance was furthered by "old-time theater seats, red velvet curtains, and vaudeville music.” Its centerpiece was "a spinning mirrored object around which little figures cartwheel and flip and have televisions dropped on their heads, all intensified by colored lights and strobes.”

2000-09

Bots 
In her 2007 exhibition ‘Menagerie' at Neuhoff Edelman Gallery, New York, McClure introduced her signature ‘Bots' to her carnivalesque zoetropic installation, '3 Ring Circus'. McClure created her ‘Bots' by deconstructing commercially available plush toys - mechanical elephants, hippos, roosters and other animals. She removed the stuffing from the toys, reconfigured their mechanical components, cast them in metal, and installed them on pedestals. Village Voice critic R.C. Baker noted, "The installation of three zoetropes featured ear-flapping, trunk-waving elephants slowly circling stainless-steel Ferris wheels and merry-go-rounds—the flashing strobe lights and minor-key music leavened big-eyed cuteness with glitzy dystopia.”

Mass-produced plush mechanical toys also served as the inspiration and original form for the kinetic sculptures McClure included in ‘Remains', her exhibition at New York's Moss Gallery in 2009. McClure's ‘half-whimsical, half-disturbing animals' stripped of their coats and stuffing were cast in bronze, their inner mechanisms intact but exposed, McClure altered the toys' sound and movement controls.

McClure's ‘Bots' sculptures reveal her fascination with the hidden, inner-workings of mechanical toys meant to be appreciated for their outsides. The artist remarked in an interview with the Seattle Times, "I was really interested in what I felt that was underneath,” she said. "It's like uncovering an object that wasn't intended to be seen in the first place, that has a beautiful design.” The sculptures' metal finishes make evident McClure's background in and appreciation for metalsmithing processes. Noting her evolution from her artistic origins in traditional metalsmithing, in a review of her ‘Remains' exhibition published in ‘Metalsmith' magazine, Bruce Metcalf proposed that McClure's ‘Bots' keep the craft of metalworking relevant -- McClure deploys a new set of strategies and addresses a new set of contexts to show how contemporary metalsmiths "can move people in a different way."

In a lecture given at Rhode Island School of Design in 2018, Murray Moss discussed McClure's ‘Bots' noting, "Through metamorphosis they seem to have aged, even wizened…Their new bronze bodies are reductive, sleek, no longer toys concerned with pleasing the viewer, they are robotic creatures of [McClure's] own vision.”

2010-19 
In 2011, Washington's Bellevue Arts Museum organized a solo exhibition of McClure's work. Titled ‘Midway', a reference to the traveling carnivals McClure attended as a child, the exhibition was the artist's largest installation to date, complete with music, whirling lights, futuristic, mechanized toys, a 10' Ferris wheel and working carousel. McClure's ‘Bots' featured in the exhibition included mechanical ‘Elmo' and ‘Mickey Mouse' toys "stripped of their commercial identities” and reconfigured by the artist to engage in repetitive motions, which "conjure dreamy cinematic operations and allude to a modern life characterized by escapism, frenzy and consumption." Curator Nora Atkinson remarked, "Midway evokes a fusion of adult and childhood fantasy with somber undertones as though the artist's creatures have run too long unchecked. It speaks of the coming and going of people/fads/phases, of displacement and discontentedness in the modern world, and of being lost in between."

For 'Mickey Hardwired', McClure's 2013 exhibition at Moss Bureau, New York, the artist gathered and arranged an army of mechanical Mickey Mouse toys from which the recognizable, soft outer layer and inner voice mechanisms had been eliminated by the artist. Rewired by McClure to move initially in near-perfect unison, the skeletal Mickeys eventually collide with one another, creating a scene which devolves into whirring, ratcheting, chaos.  McClure also presented her mechanical Mickey Mouse forms in an exhibition at Method Gallery, Seattle.

McClure sources the majority of the toys she uses for her sculptures from thrift stores, which has made her acutely aware of the abundance of cast-off and discarded products which may eventually end up in landfills. The artist's sculptures, videos, and installations highlight this "societal penchant for over-consumption and over-production.” In a review published in ‘Vanguard Seattle',T.s. Flock writes of McClure's ‘Bots', "It's hard to believe that we live in the best of all possible worlds when there is demand for cheap thrills whose plastic corpses will be polluting the oceans long after we're dead. That's not the future we were promised, and these bots are part of the lie. McClure's work reminds us that we are still being duped through with an uncanny tension between sentimentality and waste.”

In her work, McClure also considers the discrepancy between America's idealized dream of a technology-filled future and the reality of our increasingly digital lives. For the artist's 2017 solo exhibition, ‘Dispossessed' held at the Center on Contemporary Art, McClure sourced used mechanical toys and covered some in gold-leaf, to bring a new attention and value to the toys' existence at a time when there is an evident shift away from physical play toward digital forms of engagement and stimuli occurring. For McClure, the tentative status of toys in the digital era is a metaphor for our own uncertain future.

2020 - current 
In 2020 McClure displayed her installation 'Re-Imagineering' at the Louise Hopkins Underwood Center for the Arts, and in 2021 at the Texas Tech University, School of Art Studio + Folio Gallery, McClure's alma mater in Lubbock, Texas. These exhibitions included the fourth and fifth incarnations of McClure's 'Mickey Hardwired' installation.

Public art 
‘A Place in the Woods', McClure's site-specific Douglas Fir chandelier designed in collaboration with LMN architects and HLB lighting design was unveiled as a permanent installation in the entryway of the newly constructed Seattle Convention Center Summit Building on January 25, 2023. The light and shadow effect cast by the chandelier is created by forty-five strategically placed perforated wooden panels - the designs of the panels are modeled after the leaves, bark and roots of 13 Pacific Northwest native trees as seen through a microscope. The artwork was conceived by the artist to evoke the effect of sun dappling through a tree canopy.

Since 2017, McClure has been the Artist Consultant for the Seattle Convention Center which commissioned over 20 artists to create a permanent public artwork for the SCC.

Personal life 
Cathy McClure lives and works in Seattle, Washington.

References 

American contemporary artists
American women artists
1965 births
21st-century American women artists
American installation artists
Living people